Il Cammino di una grande amica is a 1951 Italian documentary film directed by Lino Lionello Ghirardini.

External links
 

1951 films
1950s Italian-language films
Italian documentary films
1951 documentary films
Italian black-and-white films
1950s Italian films